Xylamidine is a drug which acts as an antagonist at the 5HT2A receptor, and to a lesser extent at the 5HT1A receptor. It does not cross the blood–brain barrier, which makes it useful for blocking peripheral serotonergic responses like cardiovascular and gastrointestinal effects, without producing the central effects of 5HT2A blockade such as sedation, or interfering with the central actions of 5HT2A agonists.

Synthesis
Xylamidine is an amidine which serves as a serotonin inhibitor. This agent is prepared by alkylation of 3-methoxyphenol (m-methoxyphenol) with α-chloropropionitrile, KI and potassium carbonate in MEK to give #, which is in turn reduced with lithium aluminum hydride to give the primary amine #. When # is treated with m-tolylacetonitrile in the presence of anhydrous HCl, the synthesis is completed. Alternately, one can react primary amine # with m-tolylacetamidine under acid catalysis to produce xylamidine.

References 

5-HT2A antagonists
Phenol ethers
Amidines
Peripherally selective drugs